Dinara Kasko is a Ukrainian baker and media figure notable for her usage of 3D printing in cake baking.

Biography 
Kasko was born in Ukraine. She studied to be an architect but chose to retire from her career as a 3D visualizer and take up baking. Kasko's main method baking involves using a 3D printer to construct a silicon mold that could then be used to shape a cake. Her works of confectionery art employ the mathematical principles of the Voronoi diagram and biomimicry. The cakes have been compared to the art of several artists, and Kasko has collaborated with pastry magazine Sogood on a series of cake designs.

Kasko’s main bakery in Kyiv was bombed during the 2022 Russian invasion of Ukraine. Kasko, a native of Kharkiv, fled the country to the UK in the early months of the conflict. Her bakery and silicone mold business continue to operate from the UK and Poland.

References

External links
Official Website
Interview Article
Interview Article
Cannes Dessert Prize Hall of Fame

1988 births
Ukrainian chefs
Living people